
Year 687 (DCLXXXVII) was a common year starting on Tuesday (link will display the full calendar) of the Julian calendar. The denomination 687 for this year has been used since the early medieval period, when the Anno Domini calendar era became the prevalent method in Europe for naming years.

Events 
 By place 

 Byzantine Empire 
 Emperor Justinian II negotiates a peace treaty with the Umayyad Caliphate (resulting in caliph Abd al-Malik paying tribute). He removes 12,000 Christian Maronites, who continually resist the Arabs, from Lebanon. Justinian reinforces the Byzantine navy on Cyprus, and transfers cavalry troops from the Thracesian Theme in Anatolia to the Theme of Thrace in the Balkan Peninsula.

 Europe 
 Battle of Tertry: King Theuderic III of Neustria is defeated by Pepin of Herstal, mayor of the palace of Austrasia, near Péronne (modern France), at the River Somme. Theuderic withdraws to Paris and is forced to sign a peace treaty. Pepin becomes "de facto" ruler of the Frankish Kingdom, and begins calling himself Duke of the Franks. He establishes a base for the future rise of the Pippinids and the Carolingians. Pepin appoints Nordebert as Duke of Burgundy, and puts him in charge of Neustria and Burgundy (as a sort of regent).
 King Erwig dies after a 7-year reign, and is succeeded by his son-in-law Ergica as ruler of the Visigothic Kingdom.

 Britain 
 King Mul of Kent and 12 companions are burnt to death, during a Kentish uprising. His brother, King Cædwalla of Wessex, ravages the kingdom in revenge.
 Adomnán, Irish abbot of Iona, visits the court of King Ecgfrith, to ransom Irish captives (60 Gaels who had been captured in a Northumbrian raid).

 By topic 
 Religion 
 Cuthbert, bishop of Lindisfarne, resigns his office and retires to his hermitage on Inner Farne (Northumberland) where he dies, after a painful illness.
 September 21 – Pope Conon I dies at Rome after a 1-year reign, and is succeeded by Sergius I as the 84th pope of the Catholic Church. 
 Construction of the Dome of the Rock, located on the Temple Mount, is started in Jerusalem (approximate date).

Births 
 Eucherius, Frankish bishop (d. 743)
 Wei Jiansu, chancellor of the Tang dynasty (d. 763) 
 Wittiza, king of the Visigoths (approximate date)
 Yazid II, Muslim caliph (d. 724)

Deaths 
 March 20 – Cuthbert, Anglo-Saxon bishop
 September 21 – Pope Conon I
 Abd Allah ibn Abbas, cousin of Muhammad
 Erwig, king of the Visigoths
 Mul, king of Kent (England)
 Romuald I
 Wamba, king of the Visigoths

References

Sources 

 

 

da:680'erne#687